Adam David Commens (born 6 May 1976) is the brother of Scott Commens, is an Australian field hockey coach and former player.  He was born in Wagga Wagga, New South Wales.

Commens was nicknamed Billy by his teammates, and earned 143 caps (20 goals) for Australia. He was a member of the team that won the bronze medal at the 2000 Summer Olympics in Sydney.

Commens was named head coach of the Belgium national field hockey team on 4 July 2007. He was coach and a key player of the Royal Antwerp Hockey Club (RAHC). His assistant was Murray Richards.

Commens became coach of the Australia women's team at the start of 2011. When he took over as coach, he dropped five experienced players from the national squad: Kate Hollywood, Fiona Johnson, Alison Bruce, Shelly Liddelow and Amy Korner.

His contract was terminated by Hockey Australia in 2016 after their investigation into allegations that Commens "had engaged in behaviour amounting to serious misconduct". It was reported to have involved Commens exposing himself and making lewd remarks to some squad members during the Rio Olympics.

Since the Rio Olympic Games, Commens has been appointed as the High Performance Director of the Belgian Hockey Federation and won Belgium's first ever World Cup in 2018.

References

External links

 Profile on Hockey Australia

1976 births
Living people
Australian male field hockey players
Male field hockey midfielders
Australian field hockey coaches
Field hockey players at the 2000 Summer Olympics
Olympic field hockey players of Australia
Olympic bronze medalists for Australia
Olympic medalists in field hockey
Medalists at the 2000 Summer Olympics
1998 Men's Hockey World Cup players
2002 Men's Hockey World Cup players
Sportspeople from Wagga Wagga
Commonwealth Games medallists in field hockey
Commonwealth Games gold medallists for Australia
Field hockey players at the 1998 Commonwealth Games
Australian Olympic coaches
Field hockey people from New South Wales
Sportsmen from New South Wales
Expatriate field hockey players
Australian expatriate sportspeople in Belgium
Coaches at the 2008 Summer Olympics
Coaches at the 2012 Summer Olympics
Coaches at the 2016 Summer Olympics
Medallists at the 1998 Commonwealth Games
21st-century Australian people